The Second Pourier cabinet was the 19th Cabinet of the Netherlands Antilles.

Composition
The cabinet was composed as follows:

|Minister of General Affairs and Constitutional Affairs
|Miguel Pourier
|PAR
|31 March 1994
|-
|rowspan="2"|Minister of Traffic and Communications
|Leo Chance
|SPA
|31 March 1994
|-
|Danny Hassell
|WIPM
|March 1998
|-
|rowspan="2"|Minister of Justice
|Pedro Atacho 
|PAR
|31 March 1994
|-
|Mike Willem
|PAR
|March 1998
|-
|rowspan="2"|Minister of Finance
|Etienne Ys 
|PAR
|31 March 1994
|-
|Harold Henriquez
|PAR
|10 July 1995
|-
|rowspan="2"|Minister of Labor and Social Affairs
|Jeffrey Corion 
|PAR
|31 March 1994
|-
|Mike Willem
|PAR
|1996
|-
|rowspan="2"|Minister of Public Health
|Stanley Inderson 
|MAN
|31 March 1994
|-
|Beatriz Doran-Scoop
|MAN
|August 1996
|-
|rowspan="2"|Minister of Development Aid
|Edith Strauss-Marsera
|PDB
|31 March 1994
|-
|Martha Dijkhoff
|PAR
|December 1997
|-
|Minister of Education
|Martha Dijkhoff
|PAR
||31 March 1994
|-
|State Secretary of General Affairs
|Harold Arends
|PAR
|5 April 1994
|-
|rowspan="2"|State Secretary of Constitutional Affairs
|Leonora Sneek-Gibbs
|DP
|11 April 1994
|-
|Ralph Berkel
|DP
||2 January 1997
|-
|State Secretary of Economic Affairs
|Danny Hassell
|WIPM
||31 March 1994
|}

 Etienne Ys was appointed Commissioner of finance for the Island Territory of Curaçao.
A parliamentary report on the state of the prison system led Atacho to resign on 24 March 1998.
 In 1996 Inderson resigned after a faulty water filter in one of Curaçao's hospitals caused the death of nine dialysis patients.
 Corion was nominated as a member of the Pourier cabinet by the Curaçao trade union movement. He resigned on 16 July 1996 after the trade union became dissatisfied with his performance.

References

Cabinets of the Netherlands Antilles
1994 establishments in the Netherlands Antilles
Cabinets established in 1994
Cabinets disestablished in 1998
1998 disestablishments in the Netherlands Antilles